Oksana Serhiyivna Baiul-Farina (born 16 November 1977) is a Ukrainian retired competitive figure skater. She is the 1993 world champion and the 1994 Olympic champion in ladies' singles.

Baiul is the first and only skater representing Ukraine to win gold at the Winter Olympics. She is also the first Olympic champion of independent Ukraine in any sport. 

After winning the gold medal in 1994, Baiul decided to turn professional in order to tour in the United States and have a career based on her skating. She followed one of her coaches to Connecticut. Later, she also became involved in a variety of TV appearances, and benefit skates. She has lived in the United States since 1994. In 1997 she published two books, a memoir about her life and one on skating.

Early life
Baiul was born on 16 November 1977 in Dnipro, Ukrainian SSR, Soviet Union, an industrial city famous for manufacturing Soviet missiles. Her parents divorced when she was two years old, and her father, Sergey Baiul—who died in 2006—disappeared shortly after. No one is certain whether he deserted his family or was pressured to leave town when he and his wife divorced. She was raised by her mother, Marina, a French teacher, and her maternal grandparents. In addition to having Ukraine ancestry, she is of Russian descent through her maternal grandfather.

Her grandfather died in 1987, and her grandmother in 1988. In 1991, her mother, who had been very healthy, died suddenly of ovarian cancer, when Baiul was 13. Her father appeared at her mother's funeral, but Baiul wanted nothing to do with him. She lived with the wife of her coach, Stanislav Koritek, who had moved to Canada, and then with friends.

After moving to Odesa in mid-1992, Baiul lived chiefly in a dormitory. Her expenses were covered by the state because of her promise in skating. In 1993, she lived a month with coach Galina Zmievskaya between the European and World championships.

Move to the United States
After the 1994 Winter Olympics, Baiul moved to the United States and started living in Simsbury, Connecticut. It is the location of the International Skating Center of Connecticut. In the late 1990s, she followed her coach, Valentyn Nikolayev, to Richmond, Virginia, where she lived for several years before moving to Cliffside Park, New Jersey. After residing there for 14 years, Baiul moved to Pennsylvania in March 2012, settling in Upper Makefield Township, Bucks County.

In January 1997 (three years after winning the gold medal), Baiul was arrested for driving under the influence of alcohol after crashing her car into a tree in Bloomfield, Connecticut. The charges were dropped after she met the terms of probation and completed an alcohol education program. Her drinking problem worsened, however. In May 1997 she entered an alcohol rehabilitation program for two and a half months. In a 2004 interview, she said she had been sober for six years, saying "This is more important than Olympic gold."

Religious views 
Baiul was raised as a Russian Orthodox Christian. As a child, she heard rumors that her maternal grandmother was Jewish. In 2003, years after her father left the family, she phoned her old rink in Dnipro to ask for assistance in locating him. Assuming it was a prank, they hung up twice. Eventually Baiul convinced them of her identity. The rink manager helped her reunite with her father Sergey Baiul in September 2003, when she was 25 years old. 

He confirmed that her Romanian maternal grandmother was Jewish. According to Orthodox Judaism, her mother and Baiul would also be classified as Jewish by blood. Baiul decided to identify as Jewish because of the custom of matrilineality in Judaism. In 2005, she said, "Being Jewish, that feels good. It feels natural, like a second skin".

Education and training

As a child, Baiul was interested in ballet, but was told she did not have the right body type. Her grandmother took her to skating lessons, saying it was ballet on skates. Her grandfather was also supportive of her skating, which she began at age three in Dnipro. He believed that she could be a future prima ballerina and that skating was a fine training ground for dance. Baiul pursued ballet, but ultimately chose ice skating. As she trained, her mother paid for her training expenses, including lessons, costumes, and equipment. By the age of five, she was studying with Stanislav Koritek, a prominent Ukrainian coach.

She was coached by Koritek until he was offered a coaching job in Toronto, Ontario, in March 1992. He accepted due to lack of support for the sport in Ukraine as it struggled economically after the collapse of the Soviet Union. In August 1992, his father, Alfred Koritek, vice-president of the Ukrainian skating federation, called coach Galina Zmievskaya on Baiul's behalf. She took her on as a student, arranging for the girl to move to her home in Odesa. Zmievskaya welcomed her into her circle of elite skaters, and provided her shelter in her family's cramped three-room apartment in the city. Under Zmievskaya's training, Baiul made rapid progress. Her other coach in Odesa was Valentyn Nikolayev. She represented FSC "Ukraine" (Odesa, Dnipro).

Competitive career

1993 European and World championships 
Baiul began competing and took the silver medal at the 1993 European Championships in Helsinki, finishing second to Surya Bonaly of France. 

Prior to the 1993 World Championships in Prague, Baiul had crashed into the boards and displaced disks in her back and neck. At the event, she stopped practicing and consulted a Czech doctor. She competed in skates with crooked blades because it was too late to try a new pair. Ranked second in the short program and first in the free skate, she finished ahead of Bonaly and became world champion at age 15.

1994 European Championships and Winter Olympics 
In 1994, Baiul won the silver medal at the European Championships in Copenhagen, again finishing second to Bonaly. At the 1994 Winter Olympics, she was second to American Nancy Kerrigan after the short program of Ladies' singles. During a practice session before the long program, she collided with Germany's Tanja Szewczenko, sustaining a wrenched lower back and a cut on her right shin, which required three stitches. 

She received two Olympic-approved pain-killing injections of anaesthetics in her lower back and shoulder, which enabled her to compete in the free skate. She won the free skate over Kerrigan by the slimmest of margins, and so won the gold medal.  It was a controversial win that was defended by the referee, who said that Baiul had skated in an artistic and engaging style while Kerrigan skated cautiously.  She won the Olympic gold medal at the age of 16 years and 101 days, becoming one of the youngest figure skating Olympic champions. Kerrigan placed second and Chen Lu from China placed third. Baiul was announced as the winner after Surya Bonaly and Katarina Witt completed their respective programs out of medal contention. In addition to her Olympic title, Ukraine named her in 1994 as a Merited Master of Sports.

Professional career (touring) 
Despite their status as Olympic champions, Baiul and Viktor Petrenko faced difficulties in Odesa, as did fellow Ukrainians across the country. The country was struggling economically. and conditions at their rink in Odesa had deteriorated severely. The government could not extend financial support for figure skating following the breakup of the Soviet Union. Lacking a working ice resurfacer, coaches and skaters often had to resurface the rink ice by hand. 

Such conditions influenced Baiul's decision to turn professional after the 1994 Winter Olympics, although she was only 16 years old. Zmievskaya negotiated a very profitable contract for her to tour the United States following the Olympics and earn money with her sport. In May 1994, at age 16, Baiul signed an agreement with the American talent agency William Morris Endeavor.

Baiul said later that her drinking problems began during this tour. She said: 
"Except myself, nearly all the figure skaters on the bus were grown-ups, and it was full of alcohol. Most of the skaters were Russians and Americans, and they all drank. That's when I tried it. I was very young, with no one to teach me the right. I thought it was the norm, 'cause as a teenager you don't want to break away from the majority."

Following the Olympics, Baiul was plagued by physical ailments that affected her skating ability. She required arthroscopic knee surgery in the summer of 1994, after which she was advised by her doctor not to return to the ice for two months. Due to the million-dollar touring contract, Baiul ignored the doctor's recommendations. She resumed skating in two weeks and returned to performing in six. Her jumping ability became hindered.

Life after retirement from competition
In 1994, Zmievskaya was asked to lead the coaching staff at Simsbury, Connecticut's newly built International Skating Center. Both Baiul and Viktor Petrenko followed her there to train with her. 

Baiul portrayed Clara and Dorothy Gale in the CBS productions of The Nutcracker on Ice and The Wizard of Oz on Ice, respectively. In May 1997, she was dropped from the Champions on Ice tour due to concerns about her drinking. 

She decided to part ways with Zmievskaya the same year. Baiul had completed a rehab program and, in August 1998, she began training under Natalia Linichuk at the University of Delaware's skating center. She has continued to skate professionally from time to time, including an engagement with the touring show Broadway on Ice.

In December 2006, Baiul traveled to Russia and skated at the Red Square ice rink in Moscow, alongside champions from Russia, China, France, and other countries. In February 2007, she collaborated with Saule Rachmedova, a renowned ballet dancer, to bring together Ice Theatre of New York and couture fashion for the debut of fashion designer Levi Okunov's "Winter Collection." The following month, she appeared on MTV's Total Request Live.

Baiul had a role in the skating stage musical, Cold as Ice. The story explores six skaters from Canada, Russia, and the United States preparing for national championships and the Olympics while dealing with demanding coaches, stage mothers, stage coaches, and other trials. The story was conceived and written by former skater Frank D'Agostino. A full stage version of Cold As Ice was produced and presented by the Gateway Playhouse in May 2007.

On 8 March 2009, and again on 14 March 2010, Baiul made guest appearances at the Kate Wollman Skating Rink at Prospect Park in Brooklyn, New York, as part of its annual show. She also took part in meet-and-greet sessions with skating students after each performance.

Baiul has her own line of clothing and jewelry. In November 2005, she appeared on the Bravo television program Celebrity Poker Showdown. She was also part of the celebrity panel of judges (along with Steve Garvey and Jonny Moseley) on the ABC show Master of Champions, which aired briefly in 2006.

In November 2011, her manager (and future husband), Carlo Farina, discovered accounting and collection discrepancies in her account at William Morris Endeavor. After collecting $9.5 million from the company, Baiul filed a lawsuit in November 2012 in Los Angeles for an additional $1 million in compensatory damages and more in punitive damages. She sued NBCUniversal in February 2013 for their alleged illicit promotional use of her likeness. Having withdrawn the November case, she filed a broader lawsuit in New York in October 2013.

In January 2015, Baiul publicly accused her former coaches Galina Zmievskaya, Viktor Petrenko, and their manager, Joseph Lemire, of fraud, claiming they 'have been stealing money' from her for more than a decade. In addition, she accused Lemire of fraudulent attempts to represent her in multiple court proceedings in Ukraine against the state, concerning various assets.

As of January 2015, Baiul is married to her manager, Carlo Farina. She now uses the name Oksana Baiul-Farina. They reside in Las Vegas with their daughter, Sophia (born 2015).

Representation in other media
A Promise Kept (1994) is a CBS-produced TV movie made about Baiul.

Baiul is mentioned in the Family Guy TV series episode, "Wasted Talent" (season 2, episode 20), during brewmaster Pawtucket Pat's song about his brewery, in a reference to her DUI. She was also noted in the TV series episode,"The Griffin Winter Talent" (Season 17, episode 7).

The song, "Oksana", by Hawksley Workman, appears on the songwriter's album, Median Age Wasteland. It is about Baiul.

In the film I, Tonya (2017), she is played by actress Cassidy Balkcom (in an uncredited role), winning the Gold Medal in the 1994 Winter Olympics against American competitor Nancy Kerrigan (played by Caitlin Carver) .

In the film Blades of Glory (2007), Chazz Michael Michaels (played by Will Ferrell) claims to have been her one-time lover. As a possible reference to her nerves of steel, Chazz exclaims she's colder than ice, colder than dry ice: "Wait, what's colder than dry ice? I'll tell you what is. Oksana..."

Charitable involvements 
On 27 March 2010, Baiul skated at a figure skating exhibition for One Step Closer HIV AIDS. Directed and produced by Tim David, the benefit was for the AIDS Resource Foundation for Children. Baiul performed her signature Swan Lake program and was part of the meet-and-greet after the show.

Baiul supports the Tikva Children's Home Charity, which works to aid the Jewish children of Odesa. In addition, she supports and is a member of the International Museum of Women. This celebrates the lives of women around the world. Baiul also created a program to donate sled dogs to underprivileged Inuit children.'

Results
Oksana Baiul career performances.

See also
 List of Olympic medalists in figure skating

Notes

References

Further reading 
 Baiul, Oksana. (1997). Oksana: My Own Story. Random House Books. .
 Baiul, Oksana. (1997). Secrets of Skating.  Universe / Rizzoli. .

External links

  OksanaBaiul.com Official website

1977 births
Living people
Figure skaters at the 1994 Winter Olympics
Olympic figure skaters of Ukraine
Olympic gold medalists for Ukraine
People from Cliffside Park, New Jersey
Sportspeople from Dnipro
Ukrainian emigrants to the United States
Ukrainian female single skaters
Ukrainian people of Romanian-Jewish descent
Ukrainian people of Russian descent
Chevaliers of the Order of Merit (Ukraine)
Jewish Ukrainian sportspeople
Olympic medalists in figure skating
World Figure Skating Championships medalists
European Figure Skating Championships medalists
Medalists at the 1994 Winter Olympics
Former Russian Orthodox Christians